Triple Black Diamond is a limited-edition EP by Genghis Tron. The album was available at shows during their July 2007 tour and was limited to 444 copies. Following the tour, a small number of additional copies were available from the Crucial Blast website.

The "Untitled Demo (Spring '07)" was later named "Colony Collapse".

Track listing

References

Genghis Tron albums
2007 EPs